Joseph Richard Gasparella (February 5, 1927 – November 21, 2000) was an American football quarterback who played for the Pittsburgh Steelers and the Chicago Cardinals of the National Football League. He played college football at University of Notre Dame for the Notre Dame Fighting Irish.

Gasparella was the coach of the Carnegie Tech Tartans from 1963 to 1975.

Head coaching record

References

1927 births
2000 deaths
American football quarterbacks
Carnegie Mellon Tartans football coaches
Chicago Cardinals players
Notre Dame Fighting Irish football players
Pittsburgh Steelers players
People from Armstrong County, Pennsylvania
Players of American football from Pennsylvania